Theodore Edwin White (born February 4, 1938) is a Hugo Award-winning American science fiction writer, editor and fan, as well as a music critic. He writes and edits as Ted White. In addition to books and stories written under his own name, he has also co-authored novels with Dave van Arnam as Ron Archer, and with Terry Carr as Norman Edwards.

Author, editor, critic and DJ

Fandom origins
Since the time he was a teenager, White has been a prolific contributor to science fiction fanzines, and in 1968 he won the Hugo Award for Best Fan Writer. His skill as an essayist is evident in "The Bet", a memoir of a tense day in 1960 when a dispute over a record owned by music critic Linda Solomon prompted fellow science fiction writer Harlan Ellison to bet his entire record collection against a single record in White's collection, and then renege on the deal.

Despite his considerable professional credits, White maintains that his achievements in fandom mean more to him than anything else he has done. In 1953, he edited and published  Zip, the first of many fanzines he published over the following decades. In 1956–57, he co-edited Stellar with Larry Stark, followed by Void when he joined the founding editors, Gregory Benford and James Benford (1960), Minac, Egoboo and others. In addition to helping others publish their own fanzines, he was a regular columnist in Yandro and Richard E. Geis' Psychotic/SF Review. He also has been active in numerous fan events, such as organizing the 1967 World Science Fiction Convention in New York as co-chairman. As of 2018, he was still active on several of the fandom- and fanzine-oriented electronic mailing lists.

Radio
From 1977 into 1979, as Dr. Progresso, he did the Friday afternoon Dr. Progresso radio show on WGTB-FM (90.1).

Music critic
In 1959, at the age of 21, White moved from Falls Church, Virginia, to New York City with his first wife, Sylvia Dees White. That year, he began writing music criticism for Metronome and a column for Tom Wilson's Jazz Guide (later 33 Guide). As a music critic, he expanded into jazz writing and journalism for Rogue, along with LP liner notes, concert reviews and interviews. He was the only person to record an interview with Eric Dolphy (who died in 1964). Moving online, White became the music editor of the Collecting Channel  website in 1999, and he maintains his own website of music commentary under his Dr. Progresso pseudonym.

Science fiction author
"Phoenix", a 1963 collaboration with Marion Zimmer Bradley, was White's first professionally published story, which he later expanded into the novel Phoenix Prime, beginning the Qanar series of books. His first novel, Invasion from 2500 (1964), was written in collaboration with Terry Carr under the pseudonym Norman Edwards. Between 1964 and 1978 he wrote two science fiction series and 11 standalone novels, including one Captain America novel. Two of the novels were written in collaboration with Dave van Arnam, one with David Bischoff and one, using White's Doc Phoenix character, with Marv Wolfman.

White was a 1966 Nebula nominee for his short story, "The Peacock King," written with Larry McCombs. He was also instrumental in kick-starting the professional careers of other writers, notably Lee Hoffman.

Fiction editor
White held the position of assistant editor at The Magazine of Fantasy & Science Fiction from 1963 to 1968. From October 1968 until October 1978, he edited Amazing Stories and Fantastic, upgrading the quality of the fiction while showcasing a variety of talented illustrators. He also edited two 1973 anthologies, The Best from Amazing Stories and The Best from Fantastic. His reputation as an editor impressed the publishers of Heavy Metal who hired him to introduce non-fiction and prose fiction into the magazine which featured mainly graphic stories until White's arrival in 1979. In 1985, he was an associate editor of the magazine Stardate.

Musician
Ted also plays keyboards and saxophone. Currently, he performs with the Washington, DC area improvisational group Conduit.

Bibliography

Novels
 Invasion from 2500 (with Terry Carr, both writing as Norman Edwards), Monarch Books, August 1964, 126p.
 The Jewels of Elsewhen, Belmont, 1967, 172p.
 Lost in Space (with Dave van Arnam as by "Ron Archer" and Dave van Arnam) (an original novel of Lost in Space), Pyramid Books, 1967, 157p.
 Secret of the Marauder Satellite, Philadelphia, Westminster Press, 1967, 169p.
 Captain America: The Great Gold Steal, Bantam, 1968, 118p.
 Sideslip (with Dave van Arnam), Pyramid Books, 1968, 188p.
 No Time Like Tomorrow, Crown Publishers, Inc., 1969, 152p.
 By Furies Possessed, Signet, June 1970, 192p.
 Trouble on Project Ceres, Philadelphia, Westminster Press, 1971, 157p.
 Doc Phoenix. Weird Heroes #5: The Oz Encounter, (written by Marv Wolfman based on White's character), Pyramid Books, 1977, 216p.
 Forbidden World (with David Bischoff), Popular Library, 1978, 224p.

Android Tanner series
 Android Avenger, Ace Double M-123 (with John Brunner's Altar of Asconel), 1965, 113p.
 The Spawn of the Death Machine, Paperback Library, July 1968, 175p.

Qanar series
 Phoenix Prime, Lancer Books, 1966.
 The Sorceress of Qar, Lancer Books, 1966.
 Star Wolf!, Lancer Books, 1971. (Part I originally appeared in the April 1971 issue of Fantastic, under the title Wolf Quest.)

Short fiction 

Anthologies (edited)
The Best from Amazing Stories, Manor Books, 1973, 192p.
The Best from Fantastic, Manor Books, 1973, 192p.
Stories

References

External links
 
Dr. Progresso
Fanzine reviews by Ted White
Mimosa: "The Bet" by Ted White (full text), illustrated by Peggy Ranson
Science-Fiction Five-Yearly 6 (1976): "Twenty-Five Years? That's--" by Ted White (full text)

1938 births
Living people
20th-century American male writers
20th-century American novelists
20th-century American short story writers
American magazine editors
American male non-fiction writers
American male novelists
American male short story writers
American music critics
American science fiction writers
American speculative fiction critics
American speculative fiction editors
Analog Science Fiction and Fact people
Comics critics
Hugo Award-winning fan writers
Science fiction editors